Born to Be Loved is a 1959 American comedy film directed by Hugo Haas.  Set in an overcrowded tenement building, it stars Carol Morris (as Dorothy); Hugo Haas (Prof. Brauer); Dick Kallman (Eddie); and Barbara Jo Allen (Mrs. Hoffmann).

Plot
A seamstress (Carol Morris) and a music teacher (Hugo Haas) play cupid for each other, ending with a double wedding.

Cast
 Carol Morris as Dorothy Atwater
 Barbara Jo Allen as Irene Hoffman (as Vera Vague) 
 Hugo Haas as Prof. Brauner
 Dick Kallman as Eddie Flynn
 Jacqueline Fontaine as Dame
 Billie Bird as Drunk's Wife
 Pat Goldin as Saxophone Player
 Robert Foulk as Drunk (as Robert C. Foulk)
 Maryesther Denver as Hallway Woman
 Margot Baker as Suzie's Mother
 Anthony Jochim as Fred (as Tony Jochim)

See also
 List of American films of 1959

External links
 
 

1959 films
1959 romantic comedy films
American black-and-white films
Films directed by Hugo Haas
American romantic comedy films
1950s English-language films
1950s American films